A special election was held in  June 1–2, 1807 to fill a vacancy left by the death of Levi Casey (DR) on February 3, 1807.

Casey had been elected for a third term to the 10th United States Congress in the 1806 elections.  His death left a vacancy for the remainder of the 9th Congress, which remained unfilled, as well as for the 10th Congress.

Election results

Calhoun took his seat October 26, 1807, at the start of the 1st session of the 10th Congress.

See also
List of special elections to the United States House of Representatives

References

South Carolina 1807 06
South Carolina 1807 06
1807 06
South Carolina 06
United States House of Representatives 06
United States House of Representatives 1807 06